Ushana is a king featured in Hindu literature. A member of the Yadu dynasty, he is described to be the son of a king named Tamas. The Vishnu Purana states that Ushana performed a hundred ashvamedha sacrifices. Ushana is succeeded by his son, Shiteyus.

References

Characters in Hindu mythology